Erol Demiröz (1 January 1940 – 17 April 2021) was a Turkish actor. He has appeared in more than twenty films since 1979.

Selected filmography

References

External links 

1940 births
2021 deaths
Turkish male film actors
People from Diyarbakır